The Støvset Bridge is a cantilever bridge in Bodø Municipality in Nordland county, Norway. The bridge carries an arm of the Norwegian County Road 812 over the Misværfjorden. The Støvset Bridge was opened in 1993.

See also
List of bridges in Norway
List of bridges in Norway by length
List of bridges
List of bridges by length

References

External links
A picture of the Støvset Bridge
Roads, Viaducts & Bridges in Norway

Buildings and structures in Bodø
Road bridges in Nordland
Bridges completed in 1993
1993 establishments in Norway